Manufacturing Message Specification (MMS) is an international standard (ISO 9506) dealing with messaging systems for transferring real time process data and supervisory control information between networked devices or computer applications. The standard is developed and maintained by the ISO Technical Committee 184 (TC184). MMS defines the following

 A set of standard objects which must exist in every device, on which operations like read, write, event signaling etc. can be executed. Virtual manufacturing device (VMD) is the main object and all other objects like variables, domains, journals, files etc. comes under VMD.
 A set of standard messages exchanged between a client and a server stations for the purpose of monitoring or controlling these objects.
 A set of encoding rules for mapping these messages to bits and bytes when transmitted.

MMS original communication stack 
MMS was standardized in 1990 under two separate standards as
 ISO/IEC 9506-1 (2003): Industrial Automation systems - Manufacturing Message Specification - Part 1: Service Definition
 ISO/IEC 9506-2 (2003): Industrial Automation systems - Manufacturing Message Specification - Part 2: Protocol Specification
This version of MMS used seven layers of OSI network protocols as its communication stack:

MMS stack over TCP/IP 
Because the Open Systems Interconnection protocols are challenging to implement, the original MMS stack never became popular. In 1999, Boeing created a new version of MMS using Internet protocols instead of the bottom four layers of the original stack plus RFC 1006 ("ISO Transport over TCP") in the transport layer. The top three layers use the same OSI protocols as before.

In terms of the seven-layer OSI model, the new MMS stack looks like this:

With the new stack, MMS has become a globally accepted standard.

External links
 MMS Protocol Details
 MMS Overview
 MMS V1 Abstract Syntax
 MMS Protocol Description
 MMS. Presentation by Prof. Dr. H. Kirrmann, ABB Research Center, Baden, Switzerland

ISO standards